The 1991 Norwegian Football Cup Final was the final match of the 1991 Norwegian Football Cup, the 86th season of the Norwegian Football Cup, the premier Norwegian football cup competition organized by the Football Association of Norway (NFF). The match was played on 20 October 1991 at the Ullevaal Stadion in Oslo, and opposed two Tippeligaen sides Strømsgodset and Rosenborg. Strømsgodset defeated Rosenborg 3–2 to claim the Norwegian Cup for a fourth time in their history.

Match

Details

References

1991
Football Cup
Strømsgodset Toppfotball matches
Rosenborg BK matches
1990s in Oslo
Sports competitions in Oslo
October 1991 sports events in Europe